Jana Kandarr (born 21 September 1976) is a German former top 50 professional tennis player. Kandarr is notable for playing with her right hand, even though she is left-handed.

Career 
Kandarr moved with her parents from Halle to Karlsruhe after the German reunification. Her mother Petra Vogt was former European athletics champion and Sports Person of the Year in the German Democratic Republic (East Germany) in 1969. Jana Kandarr was practicing for some years  in Unterhaching before she went professional in 1994.

The biggest success of her 10-year-long career was her participation in the Australian Open in 2000, where she made the final sixteen, coming through the qualifying tournament and winning six three-set matches in a row before being forced to retire against ninth seed Julie Halard-Decugis. Also in 2000, she reached the last sixteen at the Sydney Olympics, losing to the second seed and eventual winner Venus Williams. By the end of the year, Kandarr was ranked as the No. 1 German player overall.

The furthest Kandarr advanced at a WTA tournament was the semifinals of Palermo in 1996 and Estoril in 2001. She reached her highest placing in the world ranking on 11 June 2001 - after a victory against world No. 5 Amélie Mauresmo in the first round of the French Open. After the tournament she was listed as 43rd.

Kandarr ended her professional career in 2005. Although she still plays competitive tennis occasionally in the women's tennis Bundesliga for TC 1899 Blau-Weiss Berlin.

Having stopped school in 1996 to play tennis, she only graduated in 2000. From the winter semester of 2002/03, she has been studying geoscience and biology at the Humboldt University of Berlin, while living in Berlin-Kreuzberg. Her hobbies are horse riding, reading and going to the theater.

External links
 
 

1976 births
Living people
German female tennis players
Olympic tennis players of Germany
Sportspeople from Halle (Saale)
Tennis players at the 2000 Summer Olympics